The Charlotte Greenwood Show is a radio situation comedy in the United States. It was broadcast on NBC from June 13 to September 5, 1944 and on ABC from October 15, 1944 to January 6, 1946.

Background
The program began as a summer replacement for The Bob Hope Show. Newspaper columnist Hedda Hopper reported, "The interesting thing is that she (Charlotte Greenwood) got the job on a couple of scripts written by her husband, Martin Broones, who's never before written for radio."

Format
The 1944 version of the show had Greenwood, playing herself, working as a cub reporter in a small newspaper as research in preparation for a future film role. When the program resurfaced in 1945, Greenwood's character had the responsibility of raising three children, teenagers Jack and Barbara and little Robert after her good friend died, making her executor of the estate. The setting was the fictional town of "Lakeview". 

An old time radio reference commented that Greenwood's character "managed to be single, moral, and peppy."

Characters, cast and personnel
The main characters of the latter program and the actors portraying them are shown in the table below.

Others in the cast were Shirley Mitchell, Arthur Q. Bryan, Harry Bartell and Will Wright. Wendell Niles was the announcer. The writers included Jack Hasty, Don Johnson, Ray Singer, and Phil Leslie.

References

External links

Episodic log
 Partial episodic log of The Charlotte Greenwood Show along with other radio appearances of Greenwood, radiogoldindex.com

Streaming audio
 Episodes of The Charlotte Greenwood Show, archive.org

1940s American radio programs
American comedy radio programs
ABC radio programs
NBC radio programs
1944 radio programme debuts
1946 radio programme endings